Eduard Kurt Christian Pestel (born 29 May 1914 in Hildesheim, died 19 September 1988 in Hannover) was a German industrial designer economist, professor of mechanics and politician. He was coauthor with Mihajlo Mesarovic of Mankind at the turning point, the second report to the Club of Rome in 1974 which expanded and reviewed the predictions of The Limits to Growth.

Biography 
After a three years study for bricklayer, Pestel received further education at the Fachhochschule in Hildesheim and from 1935 to 1938 at the Leibniz University Hannover.

Pestel was since 1956 a full Professor of Mechanics at the Technische Hochschule Hannover (today Leibniz University Hannover.  Pestel founded the chair of mechanics in the Faculty of Mechanical Engineering at the Technical University of Haifa (Technion) in Israel. Also, he founded in 1975 the Institute for Applied Systems Analysis and Forecast (ISP), which was renamed in his honor as the Eduard Pestel Institute for Systems Research.

In 1966 he was a member of the NATO Science Committee, and later a member of the Board of Trustees of the Volkswagen Foundation and Vice President of the Deutsche Forschungsgemeinschaft. In 1968 he was one of the founders of the Club of Rome. He also saw the founding of the German Association of the Club of Rome (DGCoR) in 1978, of which he was the first chair, position he held until his death.

In Lower Saxony, he was Minister of Science and Arts from 1977 to 1981 as a member of the CDU Party. In this time, he worked on the  restructuring of the German Technion Society founded by Albert Einstein in 1924, banned during the Nazi era and completed in 1982; it promotes cooperation between Jewish and German scientists. Eduard Pestel was president of this society until his death.

In 1982, Pestel, the Max Born Medal awarded for responsibility in science. Pestel was married to Anneliese Ude-Pestel, an analytical psychotherapist and author.

Publications 
 1963. Matrix methods in elastomechanics. With Frederick A. Leckie.
 1968. Dynamics. With William T. Thomson.
 1969. Statics . With  William Tyrrell Thomson
 1974. Multilevel computer model of world development system, April 29-May 3, 1974 : summary of the proceedings. Edited with M. Mesarovic. 
 1974. Mankind at the turning point. With Mihajlo Mesarovic.
 1989. Beyond the Limits to growth : a report to the Club of Rome.

References

External links 

 Biography at pestel-institut.de

1914 births
1988 deaths
German industrial designers
People from Hildesheim
Academic staff of the University of Haifa
University of Hanover alumni
Academic staff of the University of Hanover
20th-century  German  economists